Arthur Joseph Johnston (1866-1941) was an Irish Anglican

Johnston was educated at Trinity College, Dublin and ordained in 1891. His first post was as a curate at Drumcannon. He held incumbencies in Forkhill, Drumbanagher, Kilcullen and Athy;   and was Archdeacon of Glendalough from 1914 until 1941.

References

Alumni of Trinity College Dublin
Archdeacons of Glendalough
19th-century Irish Anglican priests
20th-century Irish Anglican priests
1941 deaths
1866 births